Khanshah (also Romanized as Khānshāh; also known as Khūnshā) is a village in Darbqazi Rural District, in the Central District of Nishapur County, Razavi Khorasan Province, Iran. At the 2006 census, its population was 15, in 5 families.

References 

Populated places in Nishapur County